Traian is a commune in Bacău County, Western Moldavia, Romania. It is composed of five villages: Bogdănești, Hertioana de Jos, Hertioana-Răzeși, Traian and Zăpodia. It also included Prăjești village until 2005, when it was split off to form a separate commune.

References

Communes in Bacău County
Localities in Western Moldavia